The Type 80  and the Type 88 are a family of Chinese second-generation main battle tanks (MBTs).  They are also known as the ZTZ80 and ZTZ88.

History 
In the 1970s China's primary MBT in service was the Type 59, a copy of the T-54 medium tank which was obsolete compared to contemporary Soviet and Western designs. The People's Liberation Army (PLA) thus requested new tanks that could match Soviet designs, which led to the development of the Type 69 medium tank that had new technology such as a laser rangefinder and two-plane stabilization. However, the Type 69 failed to satisfy PLA requirements and was only an export success that saw limited domestic service. Even then, the Type 69 was barely able to meet export requirements. Further tank development commenced which would lead to the Type 80 and Type 90 prototypes.

Type 80 and Type 85 development 
The Type 80 began development in 1978, building upon the foundation that was laid during the development of the Type 69 tank. Development took place in Factory 617 and Institute 201, Factory 447 and 616 were also involved. It was the first Chinese tank to be classified as a "Main Battle Tank". The Type 80 was a prototype which did not enter production but was the basis of improved variants such as the Type 80-I, Type 80-II and Type 85, creating a family of MBTs. The Type 80 used the turret from the Type 79 MBT but with a thickened turret front.

The Type 80-II was a prototype intended for foreign export but was unable to garner interest among foreign buyers. When sent overseas for trials, the Type 80-II's engine failed to perform satisfactorily. In a trial between the Type 80-II and the AMX-32, the Type 80-II required 8 hours to change its engine, while the AMX-32 only required an hour. This spurred Norinco's engineers to develop a brand-new export tank on the Type 80 chassis. They did this by mating a newly designed welded turret to the Type 80 chassis, in contrast to the original cast turret of the Type 80. Due to export restrictions, the Chinese were unable to use an imported 105mm gun on the Type 85 tank. This led to the development of the first locally designed 105mm gun.  This was marketed as the "Storm" series of main battle tanks and later named the Type 85 domestically. However, the first Storm tanks also failed to gather interest among potential buyers. This led to further upgrades in the Type 85 to its engine from 730hp to 800hp and changing to a semi-auto transmission. This upgraded Type 85 would eventually be designated the Type 85-II/Storm-II. The Type 85-II would catch the interest of the Pakistani government and was finally exported under the designation Type 85-IIAP or Type 85-IIM. While the Type 85 should have been named the Type 88 by its year of development, it was eventually decided that it would be retroactively named the Type 85 due to its more dated specifications.

Type 88 development 
None of the Type 80 prototypes entered domestic service.      

The Type 80 variant that entered PLA service was designated the Type 88. Visually resembled the Type 80-II. Improved variants known as the Type 88B and Type 88A later entered service. Both variants of the tank employed the same chassis and round turret but had differences in their firepower and fire control system and the ability to mount Explosive Reactive Armour (ERA).    

The Type 85-III was designated the Type 88C for domestic production. The Type 88C was renamed as the Type 96 and further upgraded in the 1990s and 2000s.    

As of 2021, the Type 88A is still in active PLA service.

Design

Overview
The chief engineer of the Type 80 was Fang Wei Xian, who also designed the Type 69 and Type 90 tank families. 

The Type 80 inherited the design philosophy of the Type 69/79 which combined a Soviet style chassis and turret with Western technology. Like the Type 69 series, the initial Type 80 design possessed a hemispherical turret similar to the T-54/55. Another similarity was that the driver sat in the left forward section of the hull. However, the Type 80 used a licence-built L7 rifled gun instead of the Soviet 100 mm rifled gun. 

The Type 80 family marked a number of firsts for Chinese tanks. Beginning from the Type 85, they were the first Chinese tanks to use a welded turret, allowing it to make use of composite armor. It was also the first tank to use six road wheels instead of five for a smoother ride at higher speeds. The Type 80 was the first Chinese tank to have applique composite armour. This was later integrated into the turret in the Type 85. Type 85-III was the first Chinese tank to use both composite armor (in its turret) and explosive reactive armor (ERA).

The Type 85-I (Storm-1) series had a new welded turret design that was angular instead of the familiar bowl-shape. The Type 85IIAP/M was the first tank in the series to be equipped with a 125 mm smoothbore gun.

Armaments
Type 80 served as a testbed for the imported ZPL-79 105mm rifled gun. On Type 88 and Type 88B, the main armament is a dual-axis stabilized ZPL-83 and ZPL-83A 105mm rifled gun with a fume extractor at its midway point. On Type 88A, the main gun is replaced by a longer, 62 caliber ZPL-94, offering longer range, higher accuracy, and capability to launch laser-guided gun-launched missile. The main gun has an elevation of -5 to 18 degrees and electronic turret drive of 20°/s for horizontal control and 6°/s for vertical. The main gun on Type 80 is loaded manually, and has a rate of fire approximately 7 rounds per minute. On Type 88B, a form of assist loader is introduced for quicker and easier reload operations with reportedly 13 rounds per minute maximum rate of fire.

Secondary armaments for all variants are the same, including one Type 59 12.7 mm heavy machine gun mounted on the turret roof, and one Type 59 7.62 mm coaxial machine gun. The Type 80 and Type 88 can store 44 rounds of ammunition for the main gun. On Type 88B and Type 88A, the tank features redesigned ammo racks with 48 rounds of ammunition. The 12.7mm heavy machine gun has 300 rounds of ammo, while the coaxial machine gun has 2250 rounds.

Electronics
The Type 80 tank is composed of laser rangefinder, digital ballistic computer, power supply, target angle measurement sensor, velocity measurement sensor, and gun positioning sensor. The driver periscope and gunner sight is fitted with passive night vision device (1st generation), daylight periscopes. The commander is fitted with one rotating periscope and four additional observation periscopes. The driver and loader have their own periscopes. The commander can override the turret direction. Type 80-I replaced the external laser rangefinder with an integrated multi-function gunner sight. The gunner sight was upgraded to second generation passive night vision.

The Type 88 tank features improved Type 37A fire control system. Type 37A features integrated gunner sight with daylight optics, passive night vision channel, and laser range finder. The daylight emergency sight from Type 80 is kept at its original location. The new fire control system has improved ballistic computer, new radio communication system, dual-axis stabilizer, self-diagnosis software, and second generation passive night-vision device for driver and gunner.

The Type 88B and Type 88A tanks are equipped with improved ISFCS-212 fire control system, with driver, gunner and commander all have access to 2nd generation passive night vision devices. The gunner sight is stabilized. Type 88A and later batches of Type 88B had its gunner sight replaced by thermal imagining devices. The fire control computer of Type 88B and Type 88A allows the commander to acquire and engage enemy target through the optical periscope mounted on the commander’s hatch.

Protection
Starting from Type 80, the tank is protected by composite armor plates are mounted on the vehicle frontal chassis and composite rubber/metal side armor skirts. The turret of Type 80/88 is still made of rolled homogeneous armour, with the exception being Type 85 series, which is constructed with welded turret and composite armor layers.

Original prototype of Type 80 had cut out on the frontal cast turret for gunner observation sight, similar to Type 59 tank. This was removed in Type 80-I and Type 88 models with roof-mounted periscopes and fire control sights.

All versions of the Type 80/85/88 tanks are fitted with thermal suppression camouflage paint, collective NBC protection system, air filtration and ventilation system, automatic fire/after-effect suppression system, and 2 sets of four 76mm smoke grenade dischargers.

Mobility
Type 80 and Type 88 tank are powered by 12150ZL diesel engine developing 730hp (537kW). The maximum road speed is 57km/h and average off-road speed is  32km/h. The power-to-weight ratio is about 18.9hp/ton. The transmission has 5 forward gears and 1 reverse gear. It has a maximum cruising range of 500 km and can negotiate a gradient of 61 % and side slope of 58%. It can cross a vertical obstacle of 0.8 m and trench of 2.7m.

Variants
In Chinese tank development, the "M" or "II" in the designation typically represents a variant primarily intended for export. Tanks for domestic use will have their own Type designation or the "I" suffix as explained below.

Type 80
Type 80/Type 80-I
Prototype Chinese second generation tank design which did not enter production. Uses an older-style round steel cast turret with new chassis. Four-man crew. Came with NBC protection. The vehicle served as a testbed for the imported ZPL-79 105mm rifled gun. Main difference between Type 80 and Type 80-I was in the fire control system with the original range finding laser mounted on the gun mantlet incorporated into the tank commander's gun sight.

Type 80-II
Type 80 developed for export purposes. Type 80-II had new 12150ZL(G) engine developing 790hp (588kW), new transmission, air ventilation system, improved vehicle radio system and thermal smoke generator.

Type 85/Storm
Type 85-I
Type 80-II chassis with welded turret. Also known as Storm-I. Had a 730hp engine.

Type 85-II
Type 80/88 chassis with welded turret. Also known as Storm-II. Featured a locally developed ZPL-94 105mm gun, 800hp engine and semi-automatic transmission.

Type 85-IIA/M
Upgraded variant of the Type 85-II/Storm-2 to suit Pakistan's specifications. The 105mm gun was changed to a 125 mm smooth bore gun with an autoloader. The original four man crew was reduced to a three man crew. Pakistan had originally wanted a 1000hp engine, but this was not available in China at the time. Export designation to Pakistan was Type 85-IIM or Type 85-IIAP (The "P" standing for "Pakistan").

Type 85-III
Developed in 1993. Upgrade for the Storm-II/Type 85-IIM with 1000 hp engine, ERA, improved FCS, and thermal night sight. It used the transmission from the T-72 tank. In 1994, when China competed against the Ukrainian T-84 for export to a tropical country, the Type 85-III performed better but suffered a higher number of faults and was thus not chosen.

Type-85UG

Pakistani upgraded version of the Type-85IIA. Upgrades include ability to fire NAIZA-DU & APFSDS-T rounds along with Ukrainian Kombat ATGMs. Moreover, it features new LRF ballistic computers and fire-control systems and a Solid-State
The sights of the tank commander, gunner & driver were also replaced with newer ones made by Thales.

Type 88 
Type 88
Type 88 was the first design of the Type 88 series. This variant never went into mass production.

Type 88B
Despite the name, Type 88B was the first mass-produced Type 88 variant. The Type 80 underwent further development and was accepted into PLA service in 1988, hence its designation was changed to Type 88. It was mounted with ZPL-83A 105mm gun which could fire all 105mm NATO gun ammunition.

Type 88A
Later variant of the Type 88B. Distinguished from Type 88B by type of 105 mm gun mounted. The Type 88A mounts a 62 caliber ZPL-94 105mm gun that is longer than the NATO L7 cannon and is capable of firing ATGMs.

Type 88C
Type 85-III produced for domestic service in the PLA. Uses an angular welded turret. Armed with a 125 mm ZPT-98 smoothbore gun with an autoloader. Equipped with JSFCS-212 fire control system (FCS) (with laser rangefinder, ballistics computer, stabilized gunner's sight and dual-axis gun stabilization), and Type 889B radio with range of up to 30 km. Later renamed to Type 96.

Operators

300 Type 88A/B 

410 Type 85-IIAP 
Being Upgraded to Type-85UG/T-85UG standards.

10 Type 85-II-M (local designation Al-Bashir) 

~5 Type 85-II-M received in 2008

See also

Al-Khalid tank
Type 69 tank
Type 96 tank
Contemporary tanks of similar performance
AMX-30
Type 74
Leopard 1
M-84
M60A1
OF-40
T-62
T-64
T-72
Al-Zarrar

References

Bibliography

Main battle tanks of Pakistan
Main battle tanks of the Cold War
Main battle tanks of China
Tanks with autoloaders
Post–Cold War main battle tanks
Tanks of Pakistan
Military vehicles introduced in the 1980s